The intendancy of Salta del Tucumán, or Province of Salta del Tucumán, was one of the territorial divisions of the Viceroyalty of the Río de la Plata within the Spanish Empire in 1782–1814.

It was subdivided, in addition to the city of Salta, between the partidos (or subdelegations) of San Miguel de Tucumán, Santiago del Estero, San Fernando del Valle de Catamarca, San Salvador de Jujuy, San Ramón de la Nueva Orán, de la Puna (with capital in Santa Catalina) and Tarija (since 1807).

Its first governor was the hitherto governor of Tucumán, Andrés de Mestre, since December 24, 1783.

References

Viceroyalty of the Río de la Plata